"You Suffer" is a song by English grindcore band Napalm Death from the band's debut studio album, Scum (1987). The song is precisely 1.316 seconds long. The song was written by Nicholas Bullen, Justin Broadrick, and Mick Harris during the March 1986 demo sessions for From Enslavement to Obliteration. 

The track currently holds the world record for shortest recorded song. In March 2023, Rolling Stone ranked the song at number 72 on their "100 Greatest Heavy Metal Songs of All Time" list.

Background and influence 
The official four-word lyrics to the song are: "You suffer, but why?". Justin Broadrick said about the song:

Nicholas Bullen, writer of the song's four-word lyrics, said that the brevity of "You Suffer" was inspired by Wehrmacht's 1985 song "E!". The song has since been recognized by Guinness World Records as the shortest ever recorded.
"You Suffer" would become an influence on the "noisecore" micro-genre, inspiring many bands such as Sore Throat, 7 Minutes of Nausea, Deche-Charge, Anal Cunt, and others to release full-length recordings of exclusively "microsong" content. Swedish metal band Opeth has covered the song live.

Release 
In 1989, "You Suffer" appeared on one side of a 7" single given away free with copies of a compilation album entitled Grindcrusher. The song on the other side, "Mega-Armageddon Death Part 3" by the Electro Hippies, also lasts approximately one second, making the disc the shortest single ever released. Each side features one groove at the outer edge of the disc containing the music, with the rest of the surface containing etched writing and cartoons.

To coincide with the release of the Scum DualDisc in March 2007, a music video produced by Earache Records was released for the song. The video shows a girl jumping up and down with fake blood/gunshot effects overlayed on the footage.

Track listing

Vinyl release

Side one
 "You Suffer" :01

Side Two 
 "Mega-Armageddon Death Part 3" (performed by Electro Hippies) :01

Digital release
 "You Suffer" :01
 "Dead" :02

In popular culture 
In 2018, "You Suffer" was featured in the 2014 HBO television series Silicon Valley in the episode "Chief Operating Officer". The character Gilfoyle uses the song as a notification for bitcoin price fluctuations; specifically, when the price drops below a certain threshold that makes it no longer profitable for his computer to mine.

References

External links 
 
 Discogs entry

1987 songs
Napalm Death songs
1989 singles
Comedy rock songs
Grindcore songs